The confidence after promotion the previous season ensured a good start at a higher level, all six matches in September 1999 being victories. First defeat of the season was at home to Birchgrove who were to finish in 2nd place and promoted. Notable results and performances were regular, including the only home defeat over eventual champions Trimsaran 30-19, away victories at Haverfordwest 23-17, Mumbles 21-11 and Newcastle Emlyn 17-12. Big wins were against Aberystwyth 51-8, Kidwelly 33-15, Gowerton 60-12, Tumble 31-15 and Mumbles at home in the last game of the season with a highly entertaining 43-32. Ominously however at the latter end of the league campaign were comprehensive losses at Aberystwyth 5-46, 15-29 at Brynamman and Kidwelly 19-62. The ‘rich’ West Wales Cup results of recent seasons continued with wins at Ammanford 45-15 and an impressive 19-10 beating of Division two Bonymaen. Unfortunately the Semi-Final draw was again versus First Division Dunvant which was scratched.
Players who had advanced their careers with other sides largely returned and Captain was Stephen Munkley. Top points scorer was Michael Morgan with 128 and Damian James scored a maximum 13 tries. Arwel Williams won both the Players Player and Supporters Player of the year awards. Impressively 49 players, all from Ystalyfera, appeared for the team in this season, a fact much envied by other teams at this level of the National League.

National League Division 4 West

Ystalyfera 1999/00 Season Results

Ystalyfera 1999/00 Season Player Stats

References

Sport in Neath Port Talbot